Saint-François de Molitor is a Roman Catholic parish church in the Auteuil-Molitor quarter of the 16th arrondissement of Paris. It replaced a Capuchin chapel built in 1941.

In 1996 its parish was carved out of the existing parishes of Notre-Dame-d'Auteuil and Sainte Jeanne-de-Chantal.

The church serves Sunday congregations of around 1,500 people, and aims to cater for a smaller parish than its predecessor. Among its principal activities is its chaplaincy to the Oiseaux Girls' School.

The architects of this radically new and innovative structure were Corinne Cailles and Jean-Marie Duthilleul.

Location
The church is situated on the Rue Molitor, close to the Roland Garros tennis stadium and the Parc des Princes football stadium. The street is named for General Gabriel Jean Joseph Molitor.

It is served by the Michel-Ange – Molitor metro station.

History
The church is dedicated to Saint Francis of Assisi. It was consecrated on 
 by Monsignor André Vingt-Trois, the Archbishop of Paris. His predecessor, Cardinal Jean-Marie Lustiger had brought the project to fruition in accord with the Vatican II guidelines (1962 – 1965) for new places of worship, as he did for other Parisian churches built during his tenure.

Architecture
The church's bell tower acts as a landmark for itself and the parish. It is slightly higher than the façade and on the same alignment, which is a difference from other new churches in Paris such as Notre-Dame-de-l'Arche-d'Alliance in the 15th arrondissement and Notre-Dame-de-la-Sagesse in the 13th.

On its southern side, the church fronts directly onto the street. It is entirely clad in semi-translucent white marble. This striking material demarks the religious character of the building and sets it apart from its neighbours. At night, because of the marble's translucence, the church's interior lighting illuminates the street outside.

At the base of the bell tower there is a monumental sculpture of a young, dynamic St Francis of Assisi by Alain Courtaigne. Francis walks towards God, among reliefs evoking his life and spiritual quest. The piece was sculpted from a single block of white granite mined in Galicia, Spain. Its siting makes it appear to rise out of the ground at the entrance of the passageway between the church and its neighbour.

A visitor entering through one of the three monumental doorways (of rare amazoué wood) will cross a narthex to get to the aisles and the nave. Its south-north orientation and elliptical form, by architects Corinne Callies and Jean-Marie Duthilleul, has 420 seating places; it is reminiscent of a barque, the symbol of evangelism. The floor slopes gently towards the altar. The baptismal font, altar, ambon and holy cross are all aligned along the major axis of the ellipse. The golden cross stands in front of a glass wall which separates it from the chancel.

The church is thus constructed around its purpose of liturgical prayer: the altar, in the centre of the ellipse and thus of the whole building, is surrounded by two spaces for priests and laity, which come together like two hands in a prayer of collect. In the small chapel to the right of the entrance, there is a 14th-century cross and tabernacle.

Gallery

References

External links

Roman Catholic churches in the 16th arrondissement of Paris